Gerd Nyquist (15 March 1913 – 22 November 1984) was a Norwegian novelist and children's writer.

Biography
She was born in Kristiania.   
She was married in  1936 with ship broker Arild Otto Nyquist (1911–1974). She was the granddaughter of government minister Bernhard Brænne (1854-1927)  and the mother of novelist and poet  Arild Nyquist (1937–2004). 

Nyquist studied journalism at the University of California and history at the University of Oslo.
During World War II she took part in the resistance movement. She was awarded the Defence Medal for her  participation in the fight against the  German occupation of Norway.

She made her literary debut in 1957 with the novel Måne over Munkeby. She is best known for her two crime novels, Avdøde ønsket ikke blomster from 1960, and Stille som i graven  from 1966 featuring  detective  Martin Bakke. Both books depict a traditional, bourgeois society from Oslo's west edge.

References

1913 births
1984 deaths
Writers from Oslo
Norwegian crime fiction writers
Norwegian children's writers
Norwegian resistance members
Female resistance members of World War II
Norwegian women in World War II
20th-century Norwegian novelists